Van Buren Township is one of four townships in Brown County, Indiana. As of the 2010 census, its population was 2,008 and it contained 941 housing units. The township includes the southern portion of Brown County State Park.

History
Van Buren Township was established in 1836. It is named for Martin Van Buren, eighth President of the United States.

In 1892, a church later known as Grandview Apostolic Church was built along Grandview Ridge Road, on the eastern edge of Van Buren Township. It was added to the National Register of Historic Places in 1991, but after it was arsoned on July 14, 2010, it was removed from the Register.

The Thomas A. Hendricks House and Stone Head Road Marker at Stone Head was listed on the National Register of Historic Places in 1984.

Geography
Black Oak Pond, Meyer Pond and Treaty Line Pond are in this township.

Unincorporated towns
 Becks Grove
 Christiansburg
 Elkinsville
 Lake on the Green
 Pikes Peak
 Spurgeons Corner
 Stone Head
 Story
(This list is based on USGS data and may include former settlements.)

Adjacent townships
 Washington (northwest)
 Harrison Township, Bartholomew County (northeast)
 Jackson Township, Bartholomew County (east)
 Ohio Township, Bartholomew County (east)
 Pershing Township, Jackson County (southeast)
 Salt Creek Township, Jackson County (southwest)

Major highways
  Indiana State Road 135

Cemeteries
The township contains eleven cemeteries: Beck' Grove, Bellsville, Cain, Christiansburg, Elkinsville, McKinney, Moffitt, Mt. Zion, Phillips, Reeves and Spiker.

References
 United States Census Bureau cartographic boundary files
 U.S. Board on Geographic Names

External links

 Indiana Township Association
 United Township Association of Indiana

Townships in Brown County, Indiana
Townships in Indiana
1836 establishments in Indiana